The Apache Relay was an American folk-rock band based out of Nashville, Tennessee. The band consisted of Michael Ford Jr (singer/guitarist), Mike Harris (guitar), Brett Moore (mandolin, organ), Steve Smith (drums), Kellen Wenrich (fiddle) and Ben Ford (bass and vocals). The band's name originated from a race-competition scene in the movie Heavyweights.

History
Formed in a dorm at Belmont University, they released the concept album 1988 in 2009 under the moniker "Michael Ford Jr. & the Apache Relay", later dropping the frontman's name for their follow-up 2011 album American Nomad. They opened for a number of Mumford & Sons tour dates, appeared at numerous music festivals, and a song from the album, "Power Hungry Animals" was used in the 2013 comedy film The Way Way Back.

In 2014 they released the single "Katie Queen of Tennessee" from their eponymous 2014 album The Apache Relay. They also recorded a cover of the Bruce Springsteen song "Cover Me" for the Dead Man's Town: A Tribute to Born in the U.S.A. compilation album.

Discography

References

External links

American folk rock groups
Musical groups established in 2009